Bruce Kuklick (born March 3, 1941, in Philadelphia, Pennsylvania) is an American historian. He currently serves as the Nichols Professor of American History at the University of Pennsylvania, specializing in diplomatic and intellectual history of the United States and the history of philosophy.

He has written several books on those subjects, including Black Philosopher, White Academy: The Career of William Fontaine, which was described as "a biography of Fontaine is as good a story as that life itself."

Selected publications 

 American policy and the Division of Germany: the clash with Russia over Reparations, 1972 
 
  Co-author with Emmanuel Gerard.

References

External links
UPenn faculty page

1941 births
Living people
University of Pennsylvania faculty
University of Pennsylvania historian
21st-century American historians
21st-century American male writers
American male non-fiction writers